The Thailand Basketball League (TBL) is a men's professional basketball league in Thailand. The league is composed 11 teams on the Men's division while the Women's division consists of six teams. The league also consists of 3 divisions: Division 1, Division 2 and Division 3. The league has a similar organization and structure as the NBA.

History
Thailand Basketball League was started in 2012 by the Basketball Sport Association of Thailand to develop basketball players in Thailand. Teams are composed of both Thai and foreign players. In 2012 and 2013 teams were allowed use 2 foreigners player on the court in the same time, but, in 2014, teams can have only 1 foreign player on the court at a time. The champions are awarded ฿3,000,000.

Teams

TBL Teams
Clubs
 Airforce-MadGoat
 Bangkok Tigers 
 Chaophraya Thunder
 Hi-Tech Bangkok City
Dunkin' Raptors - Khon Kaen
 Shoot It Dragon 
 Ban Bueng Devil Rays
 SWU
 Thailand General Equipment (TGE-Thai Krueng Sanam)
 T-Rex Nakhon Ratchasima
Former Clubs
 Black Scorpions
 OSK R. Airline
 PEA
 Mekong Raptors
 Mekong United BC
 Mono Vampire
 Mono Thewphaingarm

TBSL
Clubs
 Hi-Tech Bangkok City
 Mekong United
 Brunei Pegasus	
 Adroit
 Luang	Prabang
 NS Matrix
 CLS Knights
 Bangkok Tigers

Former Clubs 
 Dunkin' Raptors
 Nakhon Pathom Mad Goats
 Makabayan Warriors
 Mekong United BC
 Mono Vampire
 Mono Thewphaingarm
 SWU
 T-Rex Nakhon Ratchasima
 TGE 
 Hanoi Buffaloes
 ZNO Eagles

Results

Regular season and Playoffs
Regular season typically start in August. After the regular season, the league proceeds to the play-off round where the top 4 teams of the regular season match up for two games. The winners play in the final to determine the league champion.

All-Star Teams
Every team is required to send 1 player to the All-Star Team for the All-Star Game held in the middle of the season.

Rule
The league uses FIBA rules. Teams can have up to 2 foreign players in the roster but teams can only use one foreign player on the court. Teams can also have as many as five players from the national team but can only use three players on the court.

Broadcasting
Thailand Basketball League is broadcast nationwide  regular season by Mono Plus and playoffs and finals by MONO29.

See also
 Women's Thailand Basketball League (WTBL)
 Basketball Invitation Thailand Zone Championship
 Thailand Basketball Super League

References

External links
 FIBA profile
 Official Website 

Sports leagues in Thailand
League
2012 establishments in Thailand
Sports leagues established in 2012
Professional sports leagues in Thailand